Qinghailaelaps is a genus of mites in the family Laelapidae.

Species
 Qinghailaelaps cavicolous Gu, Liu & Niu, 1997.
 Qinghailaelaps gui Bai, 1992.
 Qinghailaelaps marmotae Y. M. Gu & X. Z. Yang, 1984.
 Qinghailaelaps qinghaiensis Li-Chao, Yang-Xizheng & Wang-Guol Li, 1998.

References

Laelapidae